The 1995 New Zealand rugby union tour of Italy and France was a series of matches played in October and November 1995 in Italy and France by New Zealand national rugby union team.

Results 
Scores and results list New Zealand's points tally first.

References

 

1995 rugby union tours
1995
1995 in New Zealand rugby union
1995–96 in French rugby union
1995–96 in Italian rugby union
1995–96 in European rugby union
1995
1995